Buxwaha is a Tehsil and a nagar panchayat in Chhatarpur district in the state of Madhya Pradesh, India.

Demographics
 India census, Buxwaha had a population of 9,064. Males constitute 53% of the population and females 47%. Buxwaha has an average literacy rate of 54%, lower than the national average of 59.5%; with male literacy of 63% and female literacy of 44%. 19% of the population is under 6 years of age.

There is a hilly forest area, spread over 384 hectare named buxwaha forest located near sagoria village.

References

Bundelkhand
Chhatarpur